Lazaro Mora (born 30 September 1954) is a Cuban fencer. He competed in the team sabre event at the 1976 Summer Olympics.

References

1954 births
Living people
Cuban male fencers
Olympic fencers of Cuba
Fencers at the 1976 Summer Olympics
Pan American Games medalists in fencing
Pan American Games gold medalists for Cuba
Fencers at the 1975 Pan American Games
20th-century Cuban people
21st-century Cuban people